Odonthalitus regilla is a species of moth of the family Tortricidae. It is found in Guatemala.

The length of the forewings is 7.2 mm. The forewings are pale red brown with a dark brown basal area. The hindwings are light grey brown.

References

Moths described in 1914
Euliini